Alcudia de Veo is a town in eastern Spain, in the province of Castellón, part of the autonomous community of Valencia, on  the northern side of the Serra d'Espadàn. It is crossed by the Veo River.

Castilian is the language mostly spoken in Alcudia de Veo proper, while Valencian is spoken in the parishes of Veo and Benitandús. Alcudia is home to a Moorish-origin castle; ruins of another castle exist in the abandoned village of Xinquer.

References

Municipalities in the Province of Castellón
Plana Baixa